Lubab ul-Albab (لباب الالباب) is a famous anthology written by Zahiriddin Nasr Muhammad Aufi in the early 13th century in eastern Persia. 

It is considered as the oldest extant biographical work in Persian literature and the most important collection of biographies of Persian poets. This book includes 27 biographies of the poets who lived in the same era. It was written during the reign of the Samanids.  As an example of the diversity of the material in the Lubab, it is considered the earliest known work in Muslim literature in which a compass is described in sea navigation.

Modern era
Only two hand-written copies are known to exist, one was owned by Nathaniel Blend in 1846 and the other resides in the Berlin Imperial Library. Later, the orientalist Edward Brown published Blend's copy in 1906.

See also
Persian Literature

References

Persian literature
Anthologies